Thomas William Glidden (20 July 1902 – 10 July 1974) was an English footballer who played at outside-right. He captained West Bromwich Albion to victory in the 1931 FA Cup Final, with the team also winning promotion to Division One in the same season.

Honours
West Bromwich Albion
FA Cup winners: 1931

References 
 

1902 births
1974 deaths
Footballers from Newcastle upon Tyne
English footballers
West Bromwich Albion F.C. players
Association football outside forwards
FA Cup Final players